San Biagio, previously called Sant'Agata alla Fornace or La Fornace or Carcara  is a Neoclassical architecture, Roman Catholic parish church located at the western edge of the Piazza Stesicoro in the quartiere San Biagio della Calcarella, of Catania, Sicily, southern Italy. The church overlooks a portion of the ruins of the former Ancient Roman amphitheater, while behind the apse in succession are two other churches venerating St Agatha of Sicily: the church of Sant'Agata al Carcere and two blocks west facing the opposite direction is Sant'Agata la Vetere.

History and Description
Originally there were two churches in this area, one dedicated to St Blaise (Biagio) and a church putatively built atop the furnace from which saint Agatha miraculously escaped. The church dedicated to Sant'Agata was here since the 11th-century. After the 1693 earthquake collapsed the prior structures, the present church building was commissioned and the two parishes joined.

References

18th-century Roman Catholic church buildings in Italy
Roman Catholic churches in Catania